Planty may refer to:
 Planty Park, a city park in Kraków, Poland
Planty, Podlaskie Voivodeship (north-east Poland)
 Planty, Aube, France